Arthur Baar was an Austrian-born football manager who served as vice-president of SC Hakoah Wien in Austria. After the annexation of Austria by Germany in 1938, Baar emigrated to Mandatory Palestine where he was instrumental in building football in the country, and was national team manager in the 1940 friendly against Lebanon.

Early life
Baar was born in Vienna, Austria, to a Jewish family.

References 

1890 births
1984 deaths
Austrian footballers
AC Sparta Prague players
SC Hakoah Wien footballers
Israel national football team managers
Jewish emigrants from Austria to Mandatory Palestine after the Anschluss
Footballers from Vienna
Jewish footballers
Jewish Austrian sportspeople
Association footballers not categorized by position
Austrian football managers